Martin Rauch (born June 15, 1965 in Bern, Switzerland) is a professional ice hockey defender. He played for the junior teams of the EHC Rot-Blau Bern ice hockey team until he started his pro career with the SC Bern hockey team.

Achievements 

1989 - NLA Champion with SC Bern
1991 - NLA Champion with SC Bern
1992 - NLA Champion with SC Bern
1997 - NLA Champion with SC Bern

Awards 

 His jersey number 7 has been retired by the SC Bern.

Records 

Martin Rauch is, together with Gil Montandon, Martin Steinegger and Ronnie Rüeger, one of the only players to have played more than 1000 games in the NL leagues (NLA & NLB)

International play 

Martin Rauch played a total of 116 games for the Swiss national team

Career statistics

External links 

1965 births
Living people
EHC Biel players
EHC Olten players
HC Ajoie players
HC Ambrì-Piotta players
HC Fribourg-Gottéron players
Ice hockey players with retired numbers
SC Bern players
Swiss ice hockey defencemen
Ice hockey people from Bern